Auxerrois blanc or Auxerrois Blanc de Laquenexy is a white wine grape that is important in Alsace, and is also grown in Germany and Luxembourg. It is a full sibling of Chardonnay that is often blended with the similar Pinot blanc.

History
Auxerrois blanc is thought to have originated in Lorraine, rather than near Auxerre in the Yonne. Recent DNA fingerprinting suggests that it is a cross between Gouais blanc and Pinot, the same ancestry as Chardonnay. The name Auxerrois blanc has actually been used as a synonym for Chardonnay in the Moselle region in France, which explains why there is also a longer name (Auxerrois Blanc de Laquenexy) for the grape variety.

Distribution and Wines
Seldom seen in the New World, a little is grown in North America and South Africa.

France
France's  of Auxerrois blanc are mostly in Alsace, with some in the Côtes de Toul of Lorraine. It is mostly blended into wines called "Pinot blanc" (which may actually consist of Auxerrois blanc, the variety Pinot blanc, Pinot gris and Pinot noir vinified white). It is an important component of Crémant d'Alsace.

Germany and Luxembourg
In Germany and Luxembourg it is known simply as Auxerrois. In Germany  were grown in 2012, mainly in the states of Rhineland-Palatinate and Baden-Württemberg. The main growing areas were Baden (wine region)() and Palatinate (wine region).

United States
Auxerrois is a cool climate variety and there are only five vineyards known to grow it in Oregon: Bjornson Vineyard; Zenith Vineyard, Russell-Grooters Vineyard on Savannah Ridge (Carlton Cellars), Sunnyside Vineyard, and Havlin Vineyard. David Adelsheim was influential in introducing Auxerrois to Oregon in the 1990s but has since replanted the historic vineyard from which cuttings were taken to propagate some of the current plantings, such as at Bjornson Vineyard.
Chateau Fontaine grows Auxerrois on the Leelanau peninsula in Michigan
Bel Lago Vineyards and Winery, located on the Leelanau Peninsula of Michigan, introduced Auxerrois to Michigan in 1987.  
Free Run Cellars in Berrien county, Michigan (southwest MI) is now producing it (2018). Island View Orchard planted Auxerrois on Old Mission Peninsula in Traverse City, Michigan in 2016 and it is made at Left Foot Charley.

Canada
In Canada, Auxerrois is grown on Vancouver Island in British Columbia where it is successfully blended with another cold climate grape Ortega (Dragonfly Hill Vineyard) and with Pinot Gris by Alderlea Vineyards). It is also produced as a varietal wine in the Okanagan wine country by five or six different producers, but most notably Gray Monk Vineyards, just north of Kelowna, who were responsible for bringing the grape over from Alsace in the 70's. In Ontario, the Essex Region wineries Viewpointe Estate)  and Oxley Estate produce varietal Auxerrois, and Pelee Island Winery blends Auxerrois with Chardonnay. Château des Charmes winery was the first to plant Auxerrois in the mid 1980s.

United Kingdom 
A few vineyards in the United Kingdom grow Auxerrois, notably Davenport Vineyards, Danebury Vineyard, Wyken Vineyards and a'Becketts Vineyard. Auxerrois is used to produce still and sparkling wines, often blended with other varieties. Despite success with this grape variety for the production of sparkling wines, Auxerrois is not included in the UK quality sparkling wine PDO scheme.

Vine and Viticulture
It favours limestone soils, and ripens a little earlier than Pinot blanc. It has small compact bunches.

Synonyms
Arboisier, Arnaison blanc, Arnoison, Aubaine, Auvergnat blanc, Auvernas blanc, Auvernat blanc, Auxois blanc, Bargeois blanc, Beaunois, Blanc De Champagne, Breisgauer Sussling, Burgundi Feher, Chablis, Chardennet, Chardonnay blanc, Chatey Petit, Chaudenet, Claevner, Clevner Weiss, Epinette blanche, Epinette De Champagne, Ericey blanc, Feher Chardonnay, Feherburgundi, Feinburgunder, Gamay blanc, Gelber Weissburgunder, Gentil blanc, Grosse Bourgogne, Klawner, Klevanjka Biela, Lisant, Luisant, Luizannais, Luizant, Luzannois, Maconnais, Maurillon blanc, Melon blanc, Melon D'Arbois, Moreau blanc, Morillon blanc, Moulon, Noirien blanc, Petit Chatey, Petit Sainte-marie, Pino Shardone, Pinot Blanc A Cramant, Pinot Blanc Chardonnay, Pinot Chardonnay, Plant De Tonnerre, Romere, Romeret, Rouci Bile, Rousseau, Roussot, Rulander Weiss, Sainte Marie Petite, Sardone, Shardone, Weiss Silber, Weissedler, Auxerrois blanc de Laquenexy and Auxerrois de Laquenexy.

See also
 Pinot gris - known as Auxerrois gris

Notes and references

Further reading
 Robinson, Jancis Vines, Grapes & Wines Mitchell Beazley 1986 

White wine grape varieties